Geleya is a 2007 Indian Kannada-language crime film directed by Harsha, a popular choreographer making his debut in direction. The script is written by Preetham Gubbi and the cinematography is by Krishna; all of whom had worked previously together for the blockbuster film Mungaaru Male.  The film stars Prajwal Devaraj, Tarun Chandra and Kirat Bhattal in the lead roles with Duniya Vijay and Pooja Gandhi appearing in cameo roles.

The film released on 19 October 2007 across Karnataka and set high expectations for its storyline and the team. However, upon release, the film generally met with average reviews from the critics and audience. The film is a box office success.

Plot 
Guru (Prajwal) and Vishwa (Tarun) are the best friends from the same village. They migrate to Bangalore city in search of a job and better living. Out of greed to make quick money, they join the anti-social gang who are threatening the common lives of Bangalore. Coincidentally, Guru and Vishwa join the two rival gangs who are constantly against each other. In due course, Guru kills Vishwa's boss and this enrages Vishwa who sets vengeance against Guru's boss. Vishwa becomes the leader of the gang and kills Guru's boss eventually. This leads to a massive clash between the two groups and Vishwa's wife (Kirat) tries to match up between the old friends but to no avail. A tough cop (Duniya Vijay) gets deployed to handle the case and what happens next forms the crux of the story.

Cast 
 Prajwal Devaraj as Guru
 Tarun Chandra as Vishwa
 Kirat Bhattal as Nandini
 Mico Nagaraj as Jayanna
 Kishore as Don Bhandari
 Bullet Prakash
 Sithara Vaidya
 Ninasam Ashwath
 Kuri Pratap
 Duniya Vijay in a guest appearance
 Pooja Gandhi in a guest appearance
 Rakhi Sawant as item number Naana Stylu Berene

Soundtrack 

Mano Murthy composed the music for the film and the soundtracks. The album consists of six soundtracks.

References

External links 
 Indiaglitz Review
 Times of India review

2000s crime films
2000s Kannada-language films
2007 directorial debut films
2007 films
Films about organised crime in India
Films directed by Harsha
Films scored by Mano Murthy
Indian buddy films
Indian crime films